Chimbu Devan is an Indian film director also known as a writer, cartoonist, and screenwriter. His films mostly explore the fantasy and historical genres and also comedy. He debuted with the historical comedy-drama film Imsai Arasan 23 M Pulikesi.

Career

Deven started his career as an assistant director on Cheran's 2000 film Vetri Kodi Kattu.  His first independent direction opportunity came from S Pictures with the 2006 film Imsai Arasan 23rd Pulikecei. When the plot was pitched to director S. Shankar, the latter was interested and agreed to collaborate with Deven. His second film was the 2008 fantasy comedy Arai En 305-il Kadavul, which starred Santhanam and Ganja Karuppu as the leads. His third movie, 2010's western comedy Irumbukkottai Murattu Singam, starred Raghava Lawrence and Padmapriya as the leads.

In 2015, Deven wrote and directed Oru Kanniyum Moonu Kalavaanikalum, starring Arulnithi. Then Puli, starring Vijay in the lead role and Sudeep playing the antagonist. Late actress Sridevi made a comeback in Tamil with this movie, and Shruti Haasan and Hansika Motwani played the lead actress. This movie was produced by P. T. Selvakumar and Shibu from Thameens Films, and Devi Sri Prasad scored the soundtrack. The movie was released on 1 October 2015.

In 2021, is the Venkat Prabhu’s co-production Kasada Thapara. The story is split into six portions with each portion boasting of different technicians. A collection of short stories connected by a hyperlinked narrative.

Filmography

 All films are in Tamil unless noted otherwise

References

External links
 

Artists from Madurai
Tamil film directors
Living people
1975 births
21st-century Indian film directors
Film directors from Tamil Nadu